Men's downhill competition at the 2009 World Championships was run on February 7, the fourth race of the championships.

Results

References
FIS-ski.com - official results
 Ski Racing.com - Worlds: Canadian Kucera claims downhill - 07-Feb-2009

Men's downhill
2009